The 2014–15 FC Sakhalin Yuzhno-Sakhalinsk season was the club's first season in the National Football League, the second tier in Russian football, after winning the 2013–14 Russian Professional Football League East Division. They entered the Russian Cup at the Fourth Round stage where they were eliminated by Luch-Energiya Vladivostok. It is their first season with Fail Mirgalimov as their manager after he was appointed as Head Coach on 1 July 2014. Miraglimov had his contract terminated by mutual consent in January 2015, with Igor Dobrovolski taking over as manager on 26 January.

Squad
As of 3 February 2015, according to the official FNL website.

Transfers

Summer

In:

Out:

Winter

In:

Out:

Friendlies

FNL Cup

Final Series

Competitions

Russian National Football League

Results by round

Matches

League table

Russian Cup

Squad statistics

Appearances and goals

|-
|colspan="14"|Players away from the club on loan:
|-
|colspan="14"|Players who appeared for Sakhalin Yuzhno-Sakhalinsk that left during the season:

|}

Goal Scorers

Disciplinary record

References

External links
Official website

FC Sakhalin Yuzhno-Sakhalinsk
Sakhalin Yuzhno-Sakhalinsk